The End Is Where We Begin may refer to:
The End Is Where We Begin (album), an album by Thousand Foot Krutch, or its title song
"The End Is Where We Begin" (Our Lady Peace song)